Urs Toni Bühler (born 19 July 1971) is a Swiss classically trained tenor. He is a member of the classical crossover group Il Divo, who have sold over 30 million copies worldwide discs.

Biography

Early life 
His musical training started at the age of five, when Bühler began singing in a choir and also learned to play violin, clarinet, piano, guitar, and drums. His musical career, though, started when he was fifteen in an entirely different genre from lyrical song. He was a member of a cover band and later the lead singer of a heavy metal band called "Conspiracy" when he was seventeen years old in Luzern.

Tenor 
At that time, he was already receiving music lessons at the Academy for School and Church Music. His progress in the field led him to move to Amsterdam in the Netherlands, where he studied voice at Sweelinck Conservatorium with Udo Reinemann, a well-known German baritone. Under the private tutoring of Swedish tenor Gösta Winbergh of the Royal Swedish Opera and French tenor Christian Papis, Bühler enriched his classical repertoire. He sang in the choir of the Dutch opera and performed in the Salzburg Festival under the direction of Claudio Abbado. Before joining Il Divo, he was mainly based in the Netherlands, singing oratorios and performing with the Netherlands Opera Gezelschap (NOG). Despite many performances there are only a handful of recordings available of him before Il Divo.

Il Divo 

In December 2003, Bühler became a member of the international musical quartet Il Divo along with Carlos Marín (Spain), Sébastien Izambard (France), and David Miller (United States). He had an informal first audition with the group's creator, Simon Cowell. In Cowell's office, he simply asked Bühler to sing for him unaccompanied. Impressed by Buhler's tenor voice, Cowell offered him a place in Il Divo. Their first album, Il Divo, became a worldwide multi-platinum selling record when released in November 2004, entering Billboard at number four and selling five million copies worldwide in less than a year and knocking Robbie Williams from the number one spot in the charts. Their second album, Ancora, was released on 7 November 2005 in the United Kingdom. Il Divo's third album Siempre was released on 21 November 2006 in the United States and on 27 November 2006 internationally. Their fourth album, The Promise, was released on 10 November 2008 (world) and 18 November 2008 (US), and shot straight to number 1 in the UK.

Discography

The Conspiracy 
Studio album
1991 – One to One

Il Divo 

Studio album
2004 – Il Divo
2005 – Ancora
2006 – Siempre
2008 – The Promise
2011 – Wicked Game
2013 – A Musical Affair
2015 – Amor & Pasión
2018 – Timeless

Seasonal album
2005 – The Christmas Collection

Compilations
2012 – The Greatest Hits

Live albums
2009 – An Evening with Il Divo: Live in Barcelona
2014 – Live in Japan

Special editions
2005 –  Il Divo. Gift Edition
2006 – Il Divo Collezione
2006 – Christmas Collection. The Yule Log
2008 – The Promise. Luxury Edition
2011 – Wicked Game. Gift Edition
2011 – Wicked Game. Limited Edition Deluxe Box Set
2012 – The Greatest Hits. Deluxe Limited Edition
2014 – A Musical Affair. Exclusive
2014 – A Musical Affair. French Version
2014 – Live in Japan. Japan Versión

Videography

Il Divo 
 2004 – Live At Gotham Hall
 2005 – Encore
 2005 – Mamá
 2006 – The Yule Log: The Christmas Collection 
 2006 – Live At the Greek Theater 2008 – At the Coliseum 2009 – An Evening with Il Divo: Live in Barcelona 2011 – Live in London 2014 – Live In Japan Performances Ba-ta-clan. Opera Minora. Festival Aan Zee in Noordwijk. 23 May 2001.Der Vogelhändler (plays leading role, Adam). Nieuwstad Operette in Nieuwegein. November 2002.Eine Nacht in Venedig (plays leading role, Caramello). Nieuwstad Operette in Nieuwegein. 7 November 2003.Johannes Passion''. Oude Kerk, Delft. With Philharmonisch Koor Toonkunst Rotterdam. 17 April 2003.

References

External links 

Il Divo official website

1971 births
Living people
English-language singers from Switzerland
French-language singers of Switzerland
Italian-language singers of Switzerland
Opera crossover singers
Spanish-language singers of Switzerland
Swiss drummers
Swiss male musicians
Male drummers
Swiss guitarists
Swiss male singers
Swiss pianists
Swiss tenors
Swiss violinists
Male violinists
Swiss clarinetists
Conservatorium van Amsterdam alumni
Swiss-German people
Il Divo members
Male pianists
21st-century drummers
21st-century clarinetists
21st-century violinists